Baekje or Paekche was a Korean kingdom located in southwestern Korea from 18 BC to 660 AD. It was one of the Three Kingdoms of Korea, together with Goguryeo and Silla.

Baekje was founded by Onjo, the third son of Goguryeo's founder Jumong and Soseono, at Wiryeseong (present-day southern Seoul). Baekje, like Goguryeo, claimed to succeed Buyeo, a state established in present-day Manchuria around the time of Gojoseon's fall.

Baekje alternately battled and allied with Goguryeo and Silla as the three kingdoms expanded control over the peninsula. At its peak in the 4th century, Baekje controlled most of the western Korean peninsula, as far north as Pyongyang, and may have even held territories in China, such as in Liaoxi, though this view is controversial. It became a significant regional sea power, with political and trade relations with China and Japan.

Baekje was a great maritime power; its nautical skill, which made it the Phoenicia of East Asia, was instrumental in the dissemination of Buddhism throughout East Asia and continental culture to Japan.

In 660, it was defeated by the Tang dynasty and Silla, and was ultimately submitted to Unified Silla.

Etymology 
The most common name used by most historians is Baekje (백제), meaning "hundred counties", but was originally founded by Onjo as 十濟, which figuratively means "tens of counties". Only during the reign of Geunchogo (肖古王) was it renamed as Baekje. It is also attested as 居陀羅 Kudara, meaning "great place", which could have been a possible endonym that was later on borrowed into Old Japanese.

History

Founding
Baekje is mainly composed of the native Han (Hanja: 韓人) and the Koreanic Yemaek (Hanja: 濊貊族) from Goguryeo and Buyeo. Those from the Lelang Commandery (Korean: Nakrang, Hanja: 樂浪) came in through trade and conquest, and a small number of Jin (Hanja: 辰人) were also admitted into the polities of Baekje.

Baekje was founded in 18 BC by King Onjo, who led a group of people from Goguryeo south to the Han River basin. According to the Chinese Records of the Three Kingdoms, during the Samhan period, one of the chiefdoms of the Mahan confederacy was called already Baekje.

The Samguk Sagi provides a detailed account of Baekje's founding. Jumong had left his son Yuri in Buyeo when he left that kingdom to establish the new kingdom of Goguryeo. Jumong became Divine King Dongmyeong, and had two more sons with Soseono, Onjo and Biryu. When Yuri later arrived in Goguryeo, Jumong promptly made him the crown prince. Realizing Yuri would become the next king, Soseono left Goguryeo, taking her two sons Biryu and Onjo south to found their own kingdoms with their people, along with ten vassals. She is remembered as a key figure in the founding of both Goguryeo and Baekje.

Onjo settled in Wiryeseong (present-day Hanam), and called his country Sipje (십제, 十濟, meaning "Ten Vassals"), while Biryu settled in Michuhol (present-day Incheon), against the vassals' advice. The salty water and marshes in Michuhol made settlement difficult, while the people of Wiryeseong lived prosperously.

Biryu then went to his brother Onjo, asking for the throne of Sipje. When Onjo refused, Biryu declared war, but lost. In shame, Biryu committed suicide, and his people moved to Wiryeseong, where King Onjo welcomed them and renamed his country Baekje ("Hundred Vassals").

King Onjo moved the capital from the south to the north of the Han river, and then south again, probably all within present Seoul, under pressure from other Mahan states. King Gaeru is believed to have moved the capital north of the river to Bukhansanseong in 132, probably in present-day Goyang to the northwest of Seoul.

Through the early centuries of the Common Era, sometimes called the Proto–Three Kingdoms Period, early Baekje gradually gained control over the other Mahan tribes.

Expansion

The Baekje Kingdom, which belongs to the Mahan confederacy, first integrates the Han River (Korea) basin area, then overthrows Mokji state (목지국, 目支國), the dominant country, and then integrates Mahan as a territorial state.

During the reign of King Goi (234–286), Baekje became a full-fledged kingdom, as it continued consolidating the Mahan confederacy. In 249, according to the ancient Japanese text Nihonshoki, Baekje's expansion reached the Gaya confederacy to its east, around the Nakdong River valley. Baekje is first described in Chinese records as a kingdom in 345. The first diplomatic missions from Baekje reached Japan around 367 (According to the Nihon Shoki: 247).

King Geunchogo (346–375) expanded Baekje's territory to the north through war against Goguryeo, while annexing the remaining Mahan societies in the south. During Geunchogo's reign, the territories of Baekje included most of the western Korean Peninsula (except the two Pyeongan provinces), and in 371, Baekje defeated Goguryeo at Pyongyang. Baekje continued substantial trade with Goguryeo, and actively adopted Chinese culture and technology. Buddhism became the official state religion in 384.

Baekje also became a sea power and continued mutual goodwill relationships with the Japanese rulers of the Kofun period, transmitting continental cultural influences to Japan. The Chinese writing system, Buddhism, advanced pottery, ceremonial burial, and other aspects of culture were introduced by aristocrats, artisans, scholars, and monks throughout their relationship.

During this period, the Han River basin remained the heartland of the country.

Ungjin period
In the 5th century, Baekje retreated under the southward military threat of Goguryeo, and in 475, the Seoul region fell to Goguryeo. Baekje's capital was located at Ungjin (present-day Gongju) from 475 to 538.

Isolated in mountainous terrain, the new capital was secure against the north but also disconnected from the outside world. It was closer to Silla than Wiryeseong had been, however, and a military alliance was forged between Silla and Baekje against Goguryeo.

Most maps of the Three Kingdoms period show Baekje occupying the Chungcheong and Jeolla provinces, the core of the country in the Ungjin and Sabi periods.

Sabi period
In 538, King Seong moved the capital to Sabi (present-day Buyeo County), and rebuilt his kingdom into a strong state. Temporarily, He changes the official name of the country as the Nambuyeo (lit. "Southern Buyeo"), a reference to Buyeo to which Baekje traced its origins. The Sabi Period witnessed the flowering of Baekje culture, alongside the growth of Buddhism.

Under pressure from Goguryeo to the north and Silla to the east, Seong sought to strengthen Baekje's relationship with China. The location of Sabi, on the navigable Geum River, made contact with China much easier, and both trade and diplomacy flourished during his reign and continuing on into the 7th century.

In the 7th century, with the growing influence of Silla in the southern and central Korean peninsula, Baekje began its decline.

Fall and restoration movement

In 660, the coalition troops of Silla and Tang of China attacked Baekje, which was then allied with Goguryeo. A heavily outmanned army led by General Gyebaek was defeated in the Battle of Hwangsanbeol near Nonsan. The capital Sabi fell almost immediately thereafter, resulting in the annexation of Baekje by Silla. King Uija and his son Buyeo Yung were sent into exile in China while at least some of the ruling class fled to Japan. The fall of Sabi resulted in one of the infamous episodes in Korean history, as countless Baekje court ladies, concubines and women of the nobility committed suicide by jumping off a cliff near Sabi rather than be captured by the Silla-Tang Alliance. To memoralize this tragic event in history, a pavilion stands at the so-called “Rock of the Falling Flowers” commemorating Baekje's defeat and the suicide of the kingdom's court ladies and concubines who jumped off the cliff.

Baekje forces attempted a brief restoration movement but faced Silla–Tang joint forces. A Buddhist monk Dochim (도침, 道琛) and the former Baekje general Buyeo Boksin rose to try to revive Baekje. They welcomed the Baekje prince Buyeo Pung back from Japan to serve as king, with Juryu (주류, 周留, in modern Seocheon County, South Chungcheong) as their headquarters. They put the Tang general Liu Renyuan (劉仁願) under siege in Sabi. Emperor Gaozong sent the general Liu Rengui, who had previously been demoted to commoner rank for offending Li Yifu, with a relief force, and Liu Rengui and Liu Renyuan were able to fight off the Baekje resistance forces' attacks, but were themselves not strong enough to quell the rebellion, and so for some time the armies were in stalemate.

Baekje requested Japanese aid, and King Pung returned to Baekje with a contingent of 10,000 soldiers. Before the ships from Japan arrived, his forces battled a contingent of Tang forces in Ungjin County.

In 663, Baekje revival forces and a Japanese naval fleet convened in southern Baekje to confront the Silla forces in the Battle of Baekgang. The Tang dynasty also sent 7,000 soldiers and 170 ships. After five naval confrontations, each of which the Silla-Tang joint fleet won, that took place in August 663 at Baekgang, considered the lower reaches of Geum River or Dongjin river, the Silla–Tang forces emerged victorious, and Buyeo Pung escaped to Goguryeo.

Social and political structure

The establishment of a centralized state in Baekje is usually traced to the reign of King Goi, who may have first established patrilineal succession. Like most monarchies, a great deal of power was held by the aristocracy. King Seong, for example, strengthened royal power, but after he was slain in a disastrous campaign against Silla, the nobles took much of that power away from his son.

The ruler titles of Baekje were *eraγa (於羅瑕), mostly used by the nobility, and *k(j)ə-n kici (鞬吉支), as he would be called by the commoners. The queen consort was called *oluk (於陸) and pasɨkasɨ (벗〯갓) meaning "woman companion".

The Hae clan and the Jin clan were the representative royal houses who had considerable power from the early period of Baekje, and they produced many queens over several generations. The Hae clan was probably the royal house before the Buyeo clan replaced them, and both clans appear descended from the lineage of Buyeo and Goguryeo. The "Great Eight Families" (Sa, Yeon, Hyeop, Hae, Jin, Guk, Mok, and Baek) were powerful nobles in the Sabi era, recorded in Chinese records such as Tongdian.

Central government officials were divided into sixteen ranks, the six members of the top rank forming a type of cabinet, with the top official being elected every three years. In the Sol rank, the first (Jwapyeong) through the sixth (Naesol) officials were political, administrative, and military commanders. In the Deok rank, the seventh (Jangdeok) through the eleventh (Daedeok) officials may have headed each field. Mundok, Mudok, Jwagun, Jinmu and Geuku from the twelfth to the sixteenth, may have been military administrators.

According to the Samguk Yusa, during the Sabi period, the chief minister (Jaesang) of Baekje was chosen by a unique system. The names of several candidates were placed under a rock (Cheonjeongdae) near Hoamsa temple. After a few days, the rock was moved and the candidate whose name had a certain mark was chosen as the new chief minister. Whether this was a form of selection by lot or a covert selection by the elite is not clear. This Council was called the Jeongsaamhoeui(政事巖會議,The council of rocks with state affairs).

Military
The town leaders and its subjects participated in the military of Baekje on a local level, and was distributed of the loots and captives.The subjects usually worked in the supply division. The post of Jwajang led the military. Geunchogo established the division of central military and local militaries and the people of Baekje usually served the military for three years. As Baekje entered the sabi period, the military was divided into the royal private guard, the capital central military and the local military. The royal private guard handled matters such as protecting the palace. The weapons available to the soldiers were diverse.

Archaeology
The first ever bone remains of Baekje people were found in the eungpyeongri tombs in buyeo, which made possible reconstructions of appearances of Baekje people possible, and the tombs seem to have no sign of being looted.

Language and culture
Baekje was established by immigrants from Goguryeo who spoke what could be a Buyeo language, a hypothetical group linking the languages of Gojoseon, Buyeo, Goguryeo, and Baekje. In a case of diglossia, the indigenous Samhan people, having migrated in an earlier wave from the same region, probably spoke a variety of the same language. Kōno Rokurō has argued that the kingdom of Baekje was bilingual, with the gentry speaking a Puyŏ language and the common people a Han language.

Buddhism, a religion originating in what is now India, was transmitted to Korea via China in the late 4th century. The Samguk yusa records the following 3 monks among first to bring the Buddhist teaching, or Dharma, to Korea: Malananta (late 4th century) - an Indian Buddhist monk who brought Buddhism to Baekje in the southern Korean peninsula, Sundo - a Chinese Buddhist monk who brought Buddhism to Goguryeo in northern Korea and Ado monk who brought Buddhism to Silla in central Korea.

Baekje artists adopted many Chinese influences and synthesized them into a unique artistic tradition. Buddhist themes are extremely strong in Baekje artwork. The beatific Baekje smile found on many Buddhist sculptures expresses the warmth typical of Baekje art. Taoist influences are also widespread. Chinese artisans were sent to the kingdom by the Liang dynasty in 541, and this may have given rise to an increased Chinese influence in the Sabi period.

The tomb of King Muryeong (501–523), although modeled on Chinese brick tombs and yielding some imported Chinese objects, also contained many funerary objects of the Baekje tradition, such as the gold crown ornaments, gold belts, and gold earrings. Mortuary practices also followed the unique tradition of Baekje. This tomb is seen as a representative tomb of the Ungjin period.

Delicate lotus designs of the roof-tiles, intricate brick patterns, curves of the pottery style, and flowing and elegant epitaph writing characterize Baekje culture. The Buddhist sculptures and refined pagodas reflect religion-inspired creativity. A splendid gilt-bronze incense burner ( Baekje Geumdong Daehyeongno) excavated from an ancient Buddhist temple site at Neungsan-ri, Buyeo County, exemplifies Baekje art.

Little is known of Baekje music, but local musicians were sent with tribute missions to China in the 7th century, indicating that a distinctive musical tradition had developed by that time.

Foreign relations

Relations with China

In 372, King Geunchogo paid tribute to the Jin dynasty of China, located in the basin of the Yangtze River. After the fall of Jin and the establishment of Song dynasty in 420, Baekje sent envoys seeking cultural goods and technologies.

Baekje sent an envoy to Northern Wei of Northern Dynasties for the first time in 472, and King Gaero asked for military aid to attack Goguryeo. Kings Muryeong and Seong sent envoys to Liang several times and received titles of nobility.

Tomb of King Muryeong is built with bricks according with Liang's tomb style.

Relations with Japan

Cultural impact and military assistance

To confront the military pressure of Goguryeo to its north and Silla to its east, Baekje (Kudara in Japanese) established close relations with Japan. According to the Korean chronicle Samguk Sagi, Baekje and Silla sent some princes to the Japanese court as hostages. Whether the princes sent to Japan should be interpreted as diplomats as part of an embassy or literal hostages is debated. Due to the confusion on the exact nature of this relationship (the question of whether the Baekje Koreans were family or at least close to the Japanese Imperial line or whether they were hostages) and the fact that the Nihon Shoki, a primary source of material for this relationship, is a compilation of myth, makes it difficult to evaluate. The Samguk Sagi, which also documents this, can also be interpreted in various ways and at any rate it was rewritten in the 13th century, easily seven or eight centuries after these particular events took place. Adding to the confusion is the discovery (in Japan) that the "Inariyama sword, as well as some other swords discovered in Japan, utilized the Korean 'Idu' system of writing". The swords "originated in Paekche and that the kings named in their inscriptions represent Paekche kings rather than Japanese kings". The techniques for making these swords were the apparently similar to styles from Korea, specifically from Baekje. In Japan, the hostage interpretation is dominant.

Other historians, such as those who collaborated on 'Paekche of Korea and the Origin of Yamato Japan' and Jonathan W. Best, who helped translate what was left of the Baekje annals, have noted that these princes set up schools in Yamato Japan and took control of the Japanese naval forces during the war with Goguryeo, taking this as evidence of them being more along the lines of diplomats with some kind of familial tie to the Japanese imperial family and as evidence against any hostage status. In addition, the translation of the old documents is difficult because in the past, the term "Wa" was derogatory, meaning "midget" or "dwarf," which was a reference to the perceived smaller stature of the average Japanese in ancient times. As a result, it is difficult to assess what is truly being stated, particularly in records made in Korea after the fall of Baekje, as the reference to Yamato Wa (Japan) could have been a derogatory statement by a rival nation (specifically Silla).

As is with many long-past histories and competing records, very little can be definitively concluded. Further research has been difficult, in part due to the 1976 restriction on the study of royal tombs in Japan (to include tombs such as the Gosashi tomb, which is allegedly the resting place of Empress Jingū). Prior to 1976, foreign researchers did have access, and some found Korean artifacts in Japanese dig sites. Recently in 2008, Japan has allowed controlled limited access to foreign archaeologists, but the international community still has many unanswered questions. National Geographic has written that Japan "the agency has kept access to the tombs restricted, prompting rumors that officials fear excavation would reveal bloodline links between the "pure" imperial family and Korea—or that some tombs hold no royal remains at all."

In any case, these Koreans, diplomats and royal relatives or not, brought to Japan knowledge of the Chinese writing system, Buddhism, iron processing for weapons, and various other technologies. In exchange, Japan provided military support.</ref>

According to mythical accounts in the controversial Nihon Shoki, Empress Jingū extracted tribute and pledges of allegiance from the kings of Baekje, Silla, and Goguryeo. At the height of Japanese nationalism in the early 20th century, Japanese historians used these mythical accounts along with a passage in the Gwanggaeto Stele to establish ideological rationale to the imperialist outcry for invasion of Korea. Other historians have pointed out that there is no evidence of this Japanese account in any part of Korea, in addition to not being in any viable text in China or Korea. Regarding the Gwanggaeto Stele, because the lack of syntax and punctuation the text can be interpreted 4 different ways, one which states that Korea crossed the water and subjugated Yamato. Due to this problem in interpretation, nothing can be concluded.

Scholars believe that the Nihon Shoki gives the invasion date of Silla and Baekje as the late 4th century. However, by this time, Japan was a confederation of local tribes without sophisticated iron weapons, while the Three Kingdoms of Korea were fully developed centralized powers with modern iron weapons and were already utilizing horses for warfare. It is very unlikely that a developing state such as Yamato had the capacity to cross the sea and engage in battles with Baekje and Silla. The Nihon Shoki is widely regarded to be an unreliable and biased source of information on early relations with Korea, as it mixes heavy amounts of supposition and legend with facts.

Some Japanese scholars interpret the Gwanggaeto Stele, erected in 414 by King Jangsu of Goguryeo, as describing a Japanese invasion in the southern portion of the Korean peninsula. However, Mohan claims that Goguryeo fabricated the Japanese invasion in order to justify its conquest of Baekje. If this stele was a dedication to a Korean king, it can be argued that it would logically highlight Korea's conquests and not dedicate it to a strange incident regarding Japan. In any case, because of these various possible interpretations, the circumstances surrounding the stele are still highly debated and inconclusive.

Chinese scholars participated in the study of the Stele during the 1980s. Wang Jianqun interviewed local farmers and decided that no intentional fabrication occurred, adding that the lime on the Stele was pasted by local copy-making workers to enhance readability. Xu Jianxin of the Chinese Academy of Social Sciences discovered the earliest rubbed copy which was made before 1881. He also concluded that there was no evidence the Japanese had intentionally damaged any of the characters on the Stele.

Today, most Chinese and Japanese scholars contradict the conspiracy theories, based on the study of the Stele itself and advocate Japanese intervention in the era, although its size and effect are disputed.

In the project of writing a common history textbook, Kim Tae-sik of Hongik University (Korea) denied Japan's theory. But, Kōsaku Hamada of Kyushu University (Japan) reported their interpretations of the Gwanggaeto Stele text, neither of them adopting the intentionally damaged stele theory in their interpretations.

The fall of Baekje and military support from Japan

Some members of the Baekje nobility and royalty emigrated to Japan even before the kingdom was overthrown. In response to Baekje's request, Japan in 663 sent the general Abe no Hirafu with 20,000 troops and 1,000 ships to revive Baekje with Buyeo Pung (known in Japanese as Hōshō), a son of Uija of Baekje who had been an emissary to Japan. Around August 661, 10,000 soldiers and 170 ships, led by Abe no Hirafu, arrived. Additional Japanese reinforcement, including 27,000 soldiers led by Kamitsukeno no Kimi Wakako (上毛野君稚子) and 10,000 soldiers led by Iohara no Kimi (廬原君) also arrived at Baekje in 662.

This attempt, however, failed at the Battle of Baekgang, and the prince escaped to Goguryeo. According to the Nihon Shoki, 400 Japanese ships were lost in the battles. Only half of the troops were able to return to Japan.

The Japanese army retreated to Japan with many Baekje refugees. The former royal family members were initially treated as "foreign guests" (蕃客) and were not incorporated into the political system of Japan for some time. Buyeo Pung's younger brother Seon'gwang (Zenkō in Japanese) ( or ) used the family name Kudara no Konikishi ("King of Baekje") (they are also called the Kudara clan, as Baekje was called Kudara in Japanese).

Legacy

Baekje was briefly revived in the Later Three Kingdoms of Korea period, as Unified Silla collapsed. In 892, General Gyeon Hwon established Hubaekje (“Later Baekje”), based in Wansan (present-day Jeonju). Hubaekje was overthrown in 936 by King Taejo of Goryeo.

In contemporary South Korea, Baekje relics are often symbolic of the local cultures of the southwest, especially in Chungnam and Jeolla. The gilt-bronze incense burner, for example, is a key symbol of Buyeo County, and the Baekje-era Buddhist rock sculpture of Seosan Maaesamjonbulsang is an important symbol of Seosan City.

Baekje is believed to have introduced the man'yōgana writing system to Japan, of which the modern hiragana and katakana scripts are descendants. Kojiki and the Nihon shoki both state this, and though direct evidence is hard to come by, most scholars tend to accept this idea.

On 17 April 2009, Ōuchi Kimio (大內公夫) of Ōuchi clan visited Iksan, Korea to pay tribute to his Baekje ancestors. The Ōuchi are descendants of Prince Imseong.

In 2010, Baekje Cultural Land was opened to visitors. The theme park aims to preserve Baekje architecture and culture.

Baekje Historic Areas, which feature locations with remains of the period, was designated a UNESCO World Heritage site in 2015.

See also
 Crown of Baekje
 Creation myth of Baekje
 List of Baekje people
 List of Baekje monarchs

Notes

References

Bibliography

External links

Baekje History & Culture Hall maintained by South Chungcheong Province of South Korea
Buyeo National Museum
Gongju National Museum

 
Ancient peoples
Former countries in East Asia
Former countries in Korean history
History of Korea
18 BC establishments
660 disestablishments
Three Kingdoms of Korea
States and territories established in the 1st century BC
States and territories disestablished in 660